The Boston Courant was a weekly newspaper in Boston, whose coverage focused on issues of local interest to the Back Bay, Beacon Hill, Downtown, Fenway, South End, and Waterfront neighborhoods. It had a circulation of over 40,000. 
The Boston Courant announced its closure in February 2016 after losing a wrongful termination lawsuit. In April 2016, the former publisher debuted the Boston Guardian, with similar editorial content and neighborhood coverage.

An African-American newspaper by the same name was founded by George Washington Forbes in 1890 and discontinued some time after 1900.

Establishment
Publisher David Jacobs created the Boston Courant (as the Back Bay Courant—the newspaper later expanded its coverage to include the South End, Bay Village, Fenway, and Beacon Hill) in 1995, with his wife Genevieve Tracy as associate editor. In a Boston Globe article, Jacobs stated that the Courant experienced double-digit growth from 2008 to 2009.

Sections
The paper introduced a real estate section in 2008, named "Open House". Later renamed the "Real Estate Guide", the section featured editorial copy and advertisements from Boston real estate agents as well as maps of upcoming open houses.

Online
In 2004, the publisher, David Jacobs, paid a web designer $50,000 to put the newspaper online, but the site never launched due to the lack of a profitable business plan. Jacobs believed that if the Courant had a website some of the readers would abandon the print format, crippling profitable advertising sales.

Successor publication
In April 2016, the previous publisher of the defunct Boston Courant debuted a reborn publication under the new banner of the Boston Guardian, serving the Back Bay, Beacon Hill, Downtown, Fenway, South End, and North End/Waterfront districts of Boston. The new publication's title stirred up some controversy over the alleged appropriation of a historic journalistic name.

References

Further reading 
Whitters, James, "A newspaper rivalry unfolds: Boston Courant invading turf of South End News", The Boston Globe, April 9, 2006 (Retrieved on April 13, 2009). Information about the original name of the newspaper and about its increase in scope can be found here.

External links 
 Twitter: Boston Courant

Newspapers published in Boston
Newspapers established in 1995
Weekly newspapers published in the United States
Defunct newspapers published in Massachusetts
Publications disestablished in 2016